Spy Kids 3-D: Game Over (also known as Spy Kids 3: Game Over) is a 2003 American spy action comedy film, the sequel to Spy Kids 2: The Island of Lost Dreams, and the third installment overall in the Spy Kids film series. Written and directed by Robert Rodriguez and co-produced by Elizabeth Avellán, the film stars Antonio Banderas, Carla Gugino, Alexa Vega, Daryl Sabara, Elijah Wood, Ricardo Montalbán, Holland Taylor, Mike Judge, Salma Hayek, Matt O'Leary, Emily Osment, Cheech Marin, Bobby Edner, Courtney Jines, Robert Vito, Ryan Pinkston, Danny Trejo, Alan Cumming, Tony Shalhoub, and Sylvester Stallone. It was released in the United States on July 25, 2003 by Dimension Films. Despite mixed to negative reviews, the film grossed $197 million on a $38 million budget, becoming the highest-grossing film in the series.

Though this was initially intended to be the final installment in the Spy Kids film franchise, it was eventually followed by a fourth film, Spy Kids: All the Time in the World, in 2011.

Plot 
Juni Cortez, sometime after the events of the second film, has retired from the OSS and now lives quietly, working as a private detective, though on a minuscule salary. One day, he is contacted by President Devlin, the former head of the OSS, who informs him that his sister, Carmen Cortez, is missing after a mission gone wrong.

Arriving at the technological and computer department of OSS, Juni is reunited with a now reformed Donnagon Giggles and his wife Francesca, who explain that Carmen was captured by the Toymaker, a former OSS informant who was imprisoned in cyberspace but has since created Game Over, a virtual reality-based video game which he intends on using to permanently take control of children's minds. Juni agrees to venture into the game, save Carmen, and shut it down, with only twelve hours to win. He is also informed that his sister was last seen on Level 4.

In the game, Juni finds the challenges difficult, having only nine lives and already losing one at the start. While roaming a cartoon-like medieval village, he finds three beta-testers, Francis, Arnold, and Rez, who provide him with passage to the Moon and launch him into space, but mostly to eliminate the competition.

Juni lands hard on the Moon, consequently losing another life, and receives an opportunity to bring in an ally for assistance. He chooses his grandfather Valentin, who uses a wheelchair and has a personal history with the Toymaker. Valentin receives a power-up which gives him a robotic bodysuit, allowing him to walk and possess superhuman strength and durability. Distracted by a butterfly, he abandons Juni, telling him they will regroup later. Searching for the entrance to Level 2, Juni ventures into a robot battle arena where he fights a girl named Demetra to return to Earth and Level 2. In the fight, he receives a more powerful robotic suit, and is placed on a huge mecha to combat Demetra. In the 3-round fight, in which he loses another life, he defeats her and he is allowed to keep his power suit.

He meets the beta-testers again who believe that he is a character named "The Guy", who can supposedly beat the allegedly "un-winnable" Level 5. Rez is unconvinced and challenges Juni to a "Mega-race" involving a multitude of vehicles, which will allow them onto Level 3. The only apparent rule of this game is "win at any cost". Juni wins the race with help from Valentin, and Demetra joins them; she and Juni display romantic feelings, with him giving her a med-pack with extra lives and her providing him with an illegal map of the game. Upon entering Level 3, Arnold and Juni are forced to battle, the loser getting an immediate game over. During the fight, Juni loses almost all of his lives, but Demetra swaps places with him and is defeated, seemingly getting a game over, leaving Juni devastated.

The group arrives at Level 4 where Juni finds Carmen, released by the Toymaker, who leads the group. Carmen notices their grandfather is with them and tells Juni the Toymaker is the reason their grandfather uses a wheelchair. Juni follows a map to a lava-filled gorge and the group surfs their way through it. The OSS finds out about the history between the Toymaker and Valentin. Fearing that Valentin might seek revenge, Donnagon attempts to prevent them from reaching Level 5, but fails. They fall into the lava and discover it is harmless, and they reach a cavern where they find the door to Level 5. Carmen asks how much time is remaining, and Juni informs the group that they only have 5 minutes. After the other gamers start to think that Carmen and Juni are deceivers and Rez threatens to give Juni a game over, the real Guy appears, gives the group a pep talk, zaps open the door, and walks in, arrogantly thinking it was easy. However, as part of a booby trap set by the Toymaker, he is struck by lightning which causes him collapse and his life count to rapidly drop from 99 to .5, and after The Guy nervously says "Oops", the life count drops to 0, giving him a permanent Game Over, forcing the group to move on without him.

In the Level 5 zone, a purple cyberspace, Demetra appears, claiming to have re-entered the game via a glitch but Carmen identifies her as "The Deceiver", a program used to mislead players. Demetra confirms this and apologizes to a stunned Juni before the Toymaker attacks them with giant robots. Valentin appears, holding the entrance back to the real world open so the group can escape. Demetra, shedding a tear, quickly holds the door open so he can go with them. Upon return though, it is revealed that Valentin had released the Toymaker with the villain's robot army now attacking the city.

Juni and Carmen summon their family members: parents Gregorio and Ingrid, Gregorio's brother Machete, their grandmother, and Uncle Felix. With too many robots to handle, Juni calls out for everyone to help, summoning Fegan Floop, his assistant Minion, the robot children, Dinky Winks and his son, Romero and a spork, as well as Gary and Gerti Giggles. All of the robots are destroyed except for the Toymaker's. Valentin confronts The Toymaker and forgives him for what he did, which Valentin had been trying to do for 30 years. The Toymaker shuts down his robot and joins the rest of the Cortez family and their friends in celebrating their families.

Cast 

 Antonio Banderas as Gregorio Cortez, an OSS agent and father of Juni and Carmen
 Carla Gugino as Ingrid Cortez, also an OSS agent and mother of Juni and Carmen
 Alexa Vega as Carmen Cortez, daughter of Gregorio and Ingrid, OSS agent and Juni's sister who goes missing
 Daryl Sabara as Juni Cortez, Carmen's brother, and a retired OSS agent turned private detective who is called out of retirement to rescue her
 Ricardo Montalbán as Valentin Avellan, Juni and Carmen's maternal grandfather and Ingrid's father, who is a retired OSS agent himself 
 Holland Taylor as Helga Avellan, Juni and Carmen's maternal grandmother and Ingrid’s mother
 Mike Judge as Donnagon Giggles, an OSS former director, now technician who was formerly bad in the previous film
 Matt O'Leary as Gary Giggles, the son of Donnagon Giggles and a former competing OSS agent who assists Carmen in the final battle
 Emily Osment as Gerti Giggles, the daughter of Donnagon Giggles, Gary's twin sister, a former competing OSS agent, and Juni's closest friend, who assists Juni and Carmen in the final battle
 Cheech Marin as Felix Gumm, OSS agent and Carmen and Juni's honorary uncle
 Bobby Edner as Francis, one of Juni's rivals and teammates in Game Over
 Courtney Jines as Demetra, a Game Over contestant who is also Juni's rival and crush 
 Ryan Pinkston as Arnold, a Game over contestant and one of Juni's teammates and rivals
 Robert Vito as Rez, a Game over contestant and one of Juni's teammates and rivals
 Danny Trejo as Machete, gadget inventor and uncle of Juni and Carmen who assists them in the climax
 Alan Cumming as Fegan Floop, the host of Floop's Fooglies who assists Carmen and Juni along with their parents in the final battle. He is also shown in the beginning of the 3D version of the movie, giving the viewers instructions on how to put 3D glasses.
 Tony Shalhoub as Alexander Minion, Floop's assistant who helps Carmen and Juni in the climax
 Sylvester Stallone as Sebastian "The Toymaker", a former OSS agent turned supervillain, and the creator of the virtual reality game, Game Over.

Additionally, Salma Hayek appears as Francesca Giggles, Steve Buscemi appears as Romero, Bill Paxton appears as Dinky Winks, George Clooney appears as Devlin, Elijah Wood appears as The Guy, Selena Gomez appears as Waterpark Girl, Glen Powell appears as Long-fingered Boy, and James Paxton appears as Dinky Winks Jr.

Production

Filming
Filming took place from January 10 to April 2003.

Green screen was widely used, with about 90% of the film being green screen footage.

Music 

The film score was composed by Robert Rodriguez and is the first score for which he takes solo credit. Rodriguez also performs in the "Game Over" band, playing guitar, bass, keyboard and drums, including the title track, "Game Over", performed by Alexa Vega.

All selections composed by Rodriguez and performed by Texas Philharmonic Orchestra, conducted by George Oldziey and Rodriguez.

 "Game Over" (vocals by Alexa Vega)
 "Thumb Thumbs"
 "Pogoland"
 "Robot Arena"
 "Metal Battle"
 "Toymaker"
 "Mega Racer"
 "Programmerz"
 "Bonus Life"
 "Cyber Staff Battle"
 "Tinker Toys"
 "Lava Monster Rock"
 "The Real Guy"
 "Orbit"
 "Welcome to the Game"
 "Heart Drive" (performed by Bobby Edner and Alexa Vega)
 "Game Over (Level 5 Mix)" (performed by Alexa Vega)
 "Isle of Dreams (Cortez Mix)" (performed by Alexa Vega)
 Tracks 17–18 produced by Dave Curtin for DeepMix.

Release

Home media 

The film was released via VHS and DVD on February 24, 2004, by Dimension Home Video. The film's 3-D effect was not removable on the DVD release, but a 2D version (Spy Kids 3: Game Over) was available on a second disc, and on television airings. In April 2011, the film was re-released on DVD, but only in 2D and named Spy Kids 3: Game Over.

The 2D version was released via Blu-ray on August 2, 2011. On December 4, 2012, Lionsgate released the 3D version as a double feature with The Adventures of Sharkboy and Lavagirl on Blu-ray 3D.

Reception

Box office 
Spy Kids 3-D: Game Over opened theatrically on July 25, 2003, in 3,344 venues, earning $33,417,739 in its first weekend and ranking first at the North American box office. It is the series' highest-grossing opening weekend. The film ended its run on February 5, 2004, having grossed $111,761,982 domestically and $85,250,000 internationally for a worldwide total of $197,011,982, making it the best performing film in the series.

Critical response 
Spy Kids 3-D: Game Over received mixed reviews from critics. Review aggregation website Rotten Tomatoes gives the film a 45% approval rating based on 143 reviews, with an average rating of 5.42/10. The website's critical consensus states: "The movie will be found wanting if one is not taken in by the 3-D visuals". Metacritic reports a 57/100 rating based on 30 critics, indicating "mixed or average reviews". Audiences polled by CinemaScore gave the film an average grade of "B+" on an A+ to F scale.

Bob Longino of the Atlanta Journal-Constitution wrote that "the 3-D process will hurt your eyes. The onscreen characters, who also wear 3-D glasses, even say so when it's time to take them off". However, he also stated that it helped mask what he deemed as an overall lack of a story. Jim Lane of Sacramento News and Review called the 3D scenes "murky and purple like a window smeared with grape jell-o". Roger Ebert gave the film one and a half stars out of four, suggesting that perhaps Rodriguez was held back by the film's technical constraints. Ebert also admitted to showing disdain for the 3D gimmick, saying that the picture quality with the 3D glasses is more murky and washed out than the crisper and more colorful 2D films. Mick LaSalle of the San Francisco Chronicle noted Carmen's absence for much of the film and criticized the plot's repeated scenes of Juni attempting over and over again to reach Level Five. Kimberly Jones of the Austin City Chronicle praised the visuals but called the plot twig-thin and stated that the parents' near absence in the story makes Rodriguez's continuing theme of family ties seem much less resonant than in the other films. The reason the characters were in minor roles and cameos was because Rodriguez was filming Once Upon a Time in Mexico while writing the third Spy Kids film.

For his performance as The Toymaker, Sylvester Stallone earned a Golden Raspberry Award for Worst Supporting Actor at John J. B. Wilson's 2003 Golden Raspberry Awards ceremony.

Other media

Sequel 

After the release of the film, there were plans of an animated, straight-to-DVD sequel, but it never went past pre-production and was simply an idea.

The film was eventually followed up in 2011 by a fourth film in the series, Spy Kids: All the Time in the World.

Novelization 
Talk Miramax Books released a novelization of the movie in June 2003. The novel was written by children's book author Kitty Richards. The posters and end of the credits even say "Read the Talk/Miramax Books", telling the viewers to read the print retelling.

In popular culture 
In "The Never-Ending Stories" episode of the animated TV series American Dad (Season 15, episode 9), CIA agent Stan Smith tells the class he is teaching that he is the only contributor to the Wikipedia article on Spy Kids 3-D: Game Over.

References

External links 

 
 
 
 
 
 
 

Spy Kids
2003 films
American films with live action and animation
2000s English-language films
2003 3D films
2000s adventure comedy films
American 3D films
American sequel films
American spy comedy films
American spy action films
American adventure comedy films
American children's comedy films
American children's adventure films
Films scored by Robert Rodriguez
Films about kidnapping
American films about revenge
Films about video games
Films about virtual reality
Films directed by Robert Rodriguez
Films produced by Elizabeth Avellán
Films produced by Robert Rodriguez
Films shot in Austin, Texas
Films using motion capture
Films with screenplays by Robert Rodriguez
Robert Rodriguez albums
Milan Records soundtracks
Miramax films
Dimension Films films
Troublemaker Studios films
2000s science fiction thriller films
2000s spy comedy films
American science fiction thriller films
2003 science fiction films
2000s children's comedy films
Action film soundtracks
Comedy film soundtracks
Adventure film soundtracks
2003 comedy films
Films set in 2014
Golden Raspberry Award winning films
2000s American films